Abdelhamid Brahimi (2 April 1936 – 15 August 2021) was an Algerian politician who first served as minister of planning before becoming the prime minister of Algeria under Chadli Bendjedid. He served as PM from 22 January 1984, until 5 November 1988. He wrote several books, particularly about violence in Algeria.

References 

1936 births
2021 deaths
People from Constantine, Algeria
National Liberation Front (Algeria) politicians
Government ministers of Algeria
21st-century Algerian people